= John Kern Earle =

American politician

Member of the South Carolina House of Representatives
- In office 1967–???

Personal details
- Born: March 22, 1921
- Died: December 9, 2010 (aged 89)
- Education: Furman University

John Kern Earle (March 22, 1921 – December 9, 2010) was an American politician. He served as a member of the South Carolina House of Representatives.

== Life and career ==
Earle attended Greenville High School and Furman University.

In 1967, Earle was elected to the South Carolina House of Representatives, representing Greenville County, South Carolina.

Earle died in December 2010, at the age of 89.
